The Enterprise is a highrise located in Abilene, Texas originally known as the First State Bank Tower and then Bank of America Building.  It was constructed in the early 80s and completed by 1984. This is the tallest building in the city at 20 stories  and 6th tallest in West Texas.  The building is located at 500 Chestnut St. next to the Taylor County Courthouse.

References 

Office buildings completed in 1984
1984 establishments in Texas